Eshkaft (also known as Dūzāb, Shādāb, Shegoft Shādāb, and Shohadā) is a village in Hamaijan Rural District, Hamaijan District, Sepidan County, Fars Province, Iran. At the 2006 census, its population was 133, in 26 families.

References 

Populated places in Sepidan County